Havenstreet railway station is a railway station at Havenstreet, Isle of Wight.

History
It opened in 1875 and was an intermediate stop on (successively) the Ryde and Newport Railway, Isle of Wight Central Railway, Southern Railway and British Rail-being renamed Havenstreet in 1958. It closed on 21 February 1966 but re-opened as the headquarters of the Isle of Wight Steam Railway in 1971.

Developments since re-opening have included the construction of a locomotive works, carriage and wagon repair works, additional sidings and a café.  Additionally, the former gasworks has been opened to the public as a shop and museum, the water tower formerly at Newport was re-erected at Havenstreet in 1971, and money is being raised for the construction of a carriage storage shed.

Stationmasters
Albert Gale ca. 1877
Frederick Drudge ca. 1879–1881 (afterwards station master at Horringford)
William Henry Strawn ca. 1881 ca. 1882 (formerly station master at Mill Hill, Cowes)
George Fitzgibbon ca. 1899
Frederick Deadman ca. 1910
George Spinks ca. 1915
Frederick G. Drew ca. 1935 (also station master at Ashey)

Gallery

References

External links

Isle of Wight Steam Railway photographs, WightCAM – photographically illustrated walks on the Isle of Wight.

Heritage railway stations on the Isle of Wight
Former Isle of Wight Central Railway stations
Railway stations in Great Britain opened in 1875
Railway stations in Great Britain closed in 1966
Railway stations in Great Britain opened in 1971
Beeching closures in England